The White Sister is a 1909 novel by Francis Marion Crawford and the title of various film adaptations:

 The White Sister (1915 film), starring Viola Allen
 The White Sister (1923 film), starring Lillian Gish and Ronald Colman
 The White Sister (1933 film), starring Clark Gable and Helen Hayes
 The White Sister (1960 film), a Mexican film directed by Tito Davison